The National Technical University (UTN), was founded on 4 June 2008 as the fifth public university of Costa Rica. Its purpose is to provide the means for scientific and technical education to pursue the requirements of the country.

It was the result of merging several trade and craftsmanship schools that taught at the college level:
  (CUNA)
  (CUP)
  (CURDTS)
  (ECAG)
  (CIPET)
  (CEFOF)

Campuses
 Main campus, in Alajuela canton.
 Pacific campus in Puntarenas canton.
 Atenas canton.
 Guanacaste, in Liberia canton.
 San Carlos canton.

References

2008 establishments in Costa Rica
Alajuela
Universities in Costa Rica
Educational institutions established in 2008
Institutions of Costa Rica